A Stift can be:

 a German (der Stift [plural Stifte]) and Dutch word for 'pen', 'pencil', cylindric 'pin' or 'peg'
 a German word (der Stift [plural Stifte]) for a freshman 'apprentice'
 a German word (das Stift [plural Stifte]; Dutch corresponding het sticht) for an endowment of estates, or landed estates under the secular rule of a prince of the church; also in compounds such as Hochstift
 Tübinger Stift
 a Nordic administrative jurisdiction, under a bailiff (Amtmann or Ammann in Switzerland)
 a Nordic expression for an ecclesiastical diocese